Adam Butler may refer to:
Adam Butler (American football), defensive tackle for the Miami Dolphins
Adam Butler (baseball) (born 1973), former Major League Baseball pitcher
Adam Butler (politician) (1931–2008), British Conservative Party politician
Vert (music) (Adam Butler, born 1972), electronic music producer
Adam Butler (born 1982), Australian rules footballer who was drafted to the Fremantle Football Club